Meridarchis episacta is a moth in the family Carposinidae. It was described by Edward Meyrick in 1906. It is found in Sri Lanka and on Java in Indonesia.

References

Carposinidae
Moths described in 1906